William Chantry Lowe (1877–1957) was an English professional footballer who played as a wing half.

References

1877 births
1957 deaths
People from Boston, Lincolnshire
English footballers
Association football wing halves
Grimsby United F.C. players
Grimsby All Saints F.C. players
Grimsby Town F.C. players
English Football League players